The 2022 United States House of Representatives elections in Washington were held on November 8, 2022, to elect the 10 U.S. representatives from the state of Washington, one from each of the state's 10 congressional districts. The elections coincided with other elections to the House of Representatives, elections to the United States Senate and various state and local elections. Going into this election, the Democratic Party represented seven seats, while the Republican Party represented three seats.

These were the first elections to the House of Representatives held in Washington state after the 2020 redistricting cycle. The Democratic Party gained a seat, flipping the 3rd district from Republican to Democratic control, and reducing the Republicans' share of the delegation to just two districts.

Redistricting

Process
Washington state has used a bipartisan redistricting commission to draw its districts since the passage of a ballot initiative in 1983. The Democratic and Republican parties each appoint two people to the commission, and the four appointees select a fifth member to serve as the nonvoting chair of the commission. For the 2020 redistricting cycle, the Democrats appointed April Sims, secretary-treasurer of the Washington State Labor Council, and Brady Piñero Walkinshaw, CEO of Grist and a former member of the Washington House of Representatives. The Republicans chose Paul Graves, a lawyer and former member of the Washington House of Representatives, and Joe Fain, president and CEO of the Bellevue Chamber of Commerce and a former member of the Washington Senate. They selected Sarah Augustine, executive director of the Dispute Resolution Center for Yakima and Kittitas counties, as chair.

Failure of the commission
The commission was required to approve a final set of district maps by 11:59 PM on November 15, 2021. However, for the first time since the process was enacted in 1983, the deadline was not met. Although the commission approved a set of maps with seconds to go before midnight, they did not vote to transmit those maps until after the deadline had passed. The members of the commission faced widespread criticism for missing the deadline and for making negotiations behind closed doors rather than in front of the public. Some speculated that the actions of the commission may have violated Washington's Open Public Meetings Act, which generally prohibits public commissions from making decisions in private, and the Washington Supreme Court demanded that the redistricting commission produce a detailed timeline of what occurred in the hours before the deadline. Because the commission failed to meet the deadline, the Washington Supreme Court took over responsibility for the state's maps.

Several Washington politicians expressed disappointment that the commission failed and that the supreme court would be drawing the state's maps. Republican former state senator Ann Rivers claimed that it was "fair to wonder" if some members of the commission wanted to miss the deadline so that the majority-liberal supreme court could take over redistricting. The League of Women Voters called for the entire process to be reformed, believing it should be more transparent and that the commissioners should be given more time and training. And Washington Senate Majority Leader Andy Billig said his caucus would introduce legislation to require that the final version of the commission's map be released to the public before the final vote to prevent future commissions from missing the deadline.

Supreme Court
Some speculated that maps drawn by the supreme court may have been more favorable to the Democratic Party compared to those drawn by the bipartisan commission, as five out of the court's nine justices were originally appointed by Democratic governors (three by Jay Inslee and two by Christine Gregoire). The members of the commission urged the supreme court to adopt the maps that it drew but did not approve in time. However, commissioner Walkinshaw acknowledged that there may be questions about whether the maps' handling of the Yakima River Valley may have violated the Voting Rights Act due to its distribution of Latinos. The UCLA Voting Rights Project claimed that the maps demonstrated "racially polarized voting patterns" in the region and urged the supreme court to address these issues. The supreme court granted the commission's request and adopted its maps, but it emphasized that its decision to use the commission's maps "does not render any opinion on the plan’s compliance with any statutory and constitutional requirements," meaning that the maps could still be challenged in court.

New maps
Washington's new congressional map leaves the districts largely the same, though it makes the 1st and 10th districts somewhat more liberal. The most notable change was to the 1st district, which previously reached up to the Canada–US border. Under the new map, it is more compact, with Medina and Bellevue in the south and Arlington in the north. Much of the areas cut out from the 1st district were added to the 2nd district. Previously a primarily coastal district, the 2nd now reaches further inland, taking in Skagit and Whatcom counties. The 8th district was also extended. It now reaches into Snohomish County, taking in the city of Sultan, and northern King County, taking in the city of Skykomish. Although both Snohomish and King are liberal counties, giving 58.5% and 75.0% of their vote respectively to Democrat Joe Biden in the 2020 presidential election, the portions of these counties that are inside the 8th are still notably more conservative than the counties as a whole. This, in addition to the presence of Trump-supporting Chelan and Kittitas counties and a portion of Pierce County, makes the district highly competitve.

District 1

Before redistricting, the 1st congressional district spanned the northeastern Seattle suburbs, including Redmond and Kirkland, along the Cascades to the Canada–United States border. The incumbent is Democrat Suzan DelBene, who was first elected to the 1st district in 2012. DelBene ran for re-election to a sixth full term in 2022 and won the general election with 63.6% of the vote.

Primary election

Candidates

Advanced to general
Vincent Cavaleri (Republican), Mill Creek city councilor and Snohomish County Sheriff's deputy
Suzan DelBene (Democratic), incumbent U.S. Representative and Chair of the New Democrat Coalition

Eliminated in primary
Derek Chartrand (Republican), sales executive and candidate for this seat in 2020
Matthew Heines (Republican), educator and candidate for this seat in 2020
Tom Spears (Independent), petroleum landman and U.S. Marine Corps veteran

Endorsements

Results

General election

Predictions

Results

District 2

Before redistricting, the 2nd congressional district encompassed the northern Puget Sound area, including Everett and Bellingham. The incumbent is Democrat Rick Larsen who has represented the 2nd district since 2001. Larsen most recently ran for re-election in 2022, winning 60.2% of the vote in the general election.

Primary election

Candidates

Advanced to general
Rick Larsen (Democratic), incumbent U.S Representative
Dan Matthews (Republican)

Eliminated in primary
Jason Call (Democratic), teacher and candidate for this district in 2020
Cody Hart (Republican), engineering firm owner, U.S. Navy veteran, and candidate for this district in 2020
Leif Johnson (Republican), businessman
Carrie Kennedy (Republican), conservative activist and candidate for this district in 2020
Jon Welch (Republican)
Bill Wheeler (Republican), businessman, U.S. Air Force veteran, and write-in candidate for Everett Mayor in 2021

Endorsements

Results

General election

Predictions

Results

District 3

Before redistricting, the 3rd district encompassed the southernmost portion of western and central Washington. It included the counties of Lewis, Pacific, Wahkiakum, Cowlitz, Clark, Skamania, and Klickitat, as well as a small sliver of southern Thurston county. The incumbent was Republican Jaime Herrera Beutler, who was re-elected with 56.4% of the vote in 2020, but was eliminated in the primary. Despite every major election predictor predicting this race to be "Lean R" or better for Republicans, Democrat Marie Gluesenkamp Perez won the seat by a small margin. The race has been called a microcosm of many of those across the U.S.

Primary election

Candidates

Advanced to general
Joe Kent (Republican), technology project manager, former U.S. Army chief warrant officer, former Green Beret, and widower of Shannon M. Kent
Marie Gluesenkamp Perez (Democratic), small business owner

Eliminated in primary
Oliver Black (American Solidarity)
Chris Byrd (Independent)
Leslie French (Republican), businessman
Jaime Herrera Beutler (Republican), incumbent U.S. Representative
Vicki Kraft (Republican), state representative from the 17th district
Davy Ray (Democratic), college instructor, retired musician, and candidate for this district in 2020
Heidi St. John (Republican), author and speaker

Withdrew
Brent Hennrich (Democratic), installation site supervisor (endorsed Gluesenkamp Perez)
Lucy Lauser (Democratic), artist, musician, and Skamania delegate for Bernie Sanders in 2016
Christopher Maynard (Democratic), business owner (endorsed Hennrich)
Wadi Yakhour (Republican), former special assistant to the U.S. Department of the Interior and U.S. Navy veteran

Endorsements

Polling

Results

General election

Predictions

Polling

Results

District 4

Before redistricting, the 4th congressional district encompassed rural central Washington, including Yakima and Tri-Cities area. The incumbent is Republican Dan Newhouse, who has represented the 4th district since 2015. Newhouse was one of ten Republicans in the House to vote to convict Donald Trump in his second impeachment trial in the aftermath of the January 6th insurrection. As a result, Donald Trump targeted him in the primary and endorsed another GOP candidate, Loren Culp, as a result of Newhouse's vote. Newhouse defeated Culp in the blanket primary and advanced to the general election, which he won by garnering 68.1% of the vote.

Primary election

Candidates

Advanced to general 
 Dan Newhouse (Republican), incumbent U.S. Representative
 Doug White (Democratic), farmer

Eliminated in primary
Loren Culp (Republican), former Republic police chief, U.S. Army veteran, and nominee for Governor of Washington in 2020
Benancio Garcia III (Republican), U.S. Army veteran
Corey Gibson (Republican), business owner
Brad Klippert (Republican), state representative for the 8th district and candidate for U.S. Senate in 2004 and 2006
Jacek Kobiesa (Republican), mechanical engineer
Jerrod Sessler (Republican), former NASCAR driver and U.S. Navy veteran

Endorsements

Polling

Results

General election

Predictions

Polling

Results 

}

District 5

Before redistricting, the 5th district encompassed eastern Washington, and included the city of Spokane. The incumbent is Republican Cathy McMorris Rodgers, who has represented the 5th district since 2005. McMorris Rodgers was most recently re-elected in 2022 garnering 59.7% of the vote.

Primary election

Candidates

Advanced to general
Natasha Hill (Democratic), attorney
Cathy McMorris Rodgers (Republican), incumbent U.S. Representative

Eliminated in primary
Sean Clynch (Republican)
Ann Marie Danimus (Democratic), business owner

Endorsements

Results

General election

Predictions

Results

District 6

Before redistricting, the 6th district was based on the Olympic Peninsula, and included western Tacoma. The incumbent is Democrat Derek Kilmer, who has represented the 6th district since 2013. Kilmer was most recently re-elected in 2022 garnering 60.1% of the vote in the general election.

Primary election

Candidates

Advanced to general
Derek Kilmer (Democratic), incumbent U.S. Representative
Elizabeth Kreiselmaier (Republican), Special Education Research and Program Evaluator and runner-up for this district in 2020

Eliminated in primary
Chris Binns (Republican)
Todd Bloom (Republican)
Rebecca Parson (Democratic), copywriter and candidate for this district in 2020
Tom Triggs (Independent)

Withdrew/Disqualified
Aaron Hansen (Republican), automobile assembler

Endorsements

Results

General election

Predictions

Results

District 7

Before redistricting, the 7th congressional district encompassed most of Seattle, as well as Edmonds, Shoreline, Lake Forest Park, Vashon Island, and Burien. The incumbent is Democrat Pramila Jayapal, who has represented the 7th district since 2017. Jayapal was most recently re-elected in 2022 garnering 85.7% of the vote.

Primary election

Candidates

Advanced to general
Pramila Jayapal (Democratic), incumbent U.S Representative and Chair of the Congressional Progressive Caucus
Cliff Moon (Republican)

Eliminated in primary
Paul Glumaz (Republican), LaRouche activist
Jesse James (Independent)

Withdrawn
 Earnest Thompson (Independent)

Endorsements

Results

General election

Predictions

Results

District 8

Before redistricting, the 8th district encompassed the eastern suburbs of Seattle including Sammamish, Maple Valley, Covington, Hobart, Issaquah, and Auburn and stretched into rural central Washington, including Chelan County and Kittitas County, as well as taking in eastern Pierce County. The incumbent is Democrat Kim Schrier, who has represented the 8th district since 2019. Schrier was most recently re-elected in 2022 garnering 53.4% of the vote in the general election.

Primary election

Candidates

Advanced to general
Matt Larkin (Republican), manufacturing executive and runner-up for Washington Attorney General in 2020
Kim Schrier (Democratic), incumbent U.S. Representative

Eliminated in primary
Keith Arnold (Democratic), perennial candidate
Ryan Burkett (Independent), perennial candidate
Dave Chapman (Republican)
Patrick Dillon (Independent), candidate for this district in 2018
Reagan Dunn (Republican), King County Councilor and son of former U.S. Representative Jennifer Dunn
Justin Greywolf (Libertarian), software engineer
Jesse Jensen (Republican), U.S. Army veteran, Amazon senior project manager, and runner-up for this district in 2020
Scott Stephenson (Republican), program manager
Emet Ward (Democratic)

Endorsements

Polling

Results

General election

Predictions

Polling

Kim Schrier vs. Reagan Dunn

Kim Schrier vs. Jesse Jensen

Debate 
A debate is scheduled for October 28 at Central Washington University.

Results

District 9

Before redistricting, the 9th congressional district stretched from small parts of northeastern Tacoma up to southeastern Seattle, taking in the surrounding suburbs, including Federal Way, Des Moines, Kent, SeaTac, Renton, Mercer Island, and Bellevue. The incumbent is Democrat Adam Smith, who has represented the 9th district since 1997. Smith was most recently re-elected in 2022 garnering 71.7% of the vote in the general election.

Primary election

Candidates

Advanced to general
Doug Basler (Republican), perennial candidate
Adam Smith (Democratic), incumbent U.S. Representative

Eliminated in primary
David Anderson (Independent), candidate for Washington Secretary of State in 2012
Sea Chan (Republican), maritime professional and environmental researcher
Stephanie Gallardo (Democratic), teacher and WEA/NEA board director
Seth Pedersen (Republican)

Withdrew
Krystal Marx (Democratic), deputy mayor of Burien and executive director of Seattle Pride (running for re-election, endorsed Gallardo)

Declined
Sarah Smith (Democratic), runner-up for this district in 2018 (endorsed Gallardo)

Endorsements

Results

General election

Predictions

Debate 
A debate is scheduled for October 25 at Seattle University.

Results

District 10

Before redistricting, the 10th district included Olympia and the Tacoma suburbs, including Puyallup, Lakewood, and University Place. The incumbent is Democrat Marilyn Strickland, who has represented the 10th district since 2021. Strickland most recently ran for re-election in 2022 garnering 57.1% of the vote in the general election.

Primary election

Candidates

Advanced to general
Marilyn Strickland (Democratic), incumbent U.S. Representative

Eliminated in primary
Richard Boyce (Independent)
Dan Gordon (Republican), candidate for this district in 2020
Eric Mahaffy (Democratic)

Withdrew/Disqualified
Don Hewett (Republican), electrical engineer, U.S. Air Force veteran, and candidate for this district in 2020

Endorsements

Results

General election

Predictions

Results

Notes

Partisan clients

References

External links
 
 
  (State affiliate of the U.S. League of Women Voters)
 

Official campaign websites for 1st district candidates
Suzan DelBene (D) for Congress
Vincent Cavaleri (R) for Congress

Official campaign websites for 2nd district candidates
Rick Larsen (D) for Congress
Dan Matthews (R) for Congress

Official campaign websites for 3rd district candidates
Joe Kent (R) for Congress
Marie Perez (D) for Congress

Official campaign websites for 4th district candidates
Dan Newhouse (R) for Congress
Doug White (D) for Congress

Official campaign websites for 5th district candidates
Natasha Hill (D) for Congress
Cathy McMorris Rodgers (R) for Congress

Official campaign websites for 6th district candidates
Derek Kilmer (D) for Congress
Elizabeth Kreiselmaier (R) for Congress

Official campaign websites for 8th district candidates
Matt Larkin (R) for Congress
Kim Schrier (D) for Congress

Official campaign websites for 9th district candidates
Doug Basler (R) for Congress
Adam Smith (D) for Congress

Official campaign websites for 10th district candidates
Marilyn Strickland (D) for Congress
Keith Swank (R) for Congress

2022
Washington
United States House of Representatives